Biting Elbows is a Russian indie rock band that was formed in 2008 in Moscow.

In 2012, they were an opening act for Guns N' Roses and Placebo's concerts in Moscow, played at Maxidrom. In 2013, they played at Park Live Festival.

The band is perhaps best known for its music videos for the songs "The Stampede" and "Bad Motherfucker". The videos, directed by frontman Ilya Naishuller, went viral because of their first person perspective, special effects, and action. Naishuller directed a full-length first-person action/sci-fi/adventure film written by himself, Hardcore Henry (2015), starring Sharlto Copley and Danila Kozlovsky. Biting Elbows wrote the songs "My Woman" and "For the Kill" for the film's soundtrack, the former being featured in their second album, Shorten the Longing, which was released on June 26, 2020. Three other songs from the album ("Control", "Alone", and "Other Me") were featured in the Director's Cut edition of the video game Death Stranding which was released on September 24, 2021. The video game's designer Hideo Kojima referred to Naishuller as "a genius artist of 21st century music and video".

Discography

Studio albums

Extended plays

Singles

References

External links
 Biting Elbows official website

Russian rock music groups
Musical groups established in 2008
Musical groups from Moscow